Nikolai Alexandrovich Bulganin (– 24 February 1975) was a Soviet politician who served as Minister of Defense (1953–1955) and Premier of the Soviet Union (1955–1958) under Nikita Khrushchev, following service in the Red Army and as defence minister under Joseph Stalin.

Early life and career
Bulganin was born in 1895 in Nizhny Novgorod. The son of an office worker, he was of Russian ethnicity. He joined the Bolshevik Party in March 1917 and was recruited in 1918 into the Cheka, the Bolshevik regime's political police, where he served until 1922. During the summer of 1918, he worked with Lazar Kaganovich, the local communist leader, in imposing the Red Terror in Nizhny Novgorod. He worked with Kaganovich again in Turkestan in 1920. After the Russian Civil War (1917-1923), Bulganin became an industrial manager and worked in the electricity administration until 1927. He was the director of the Moscow electricity supply from 1927 to 1931. From 1931 to 1937, he served as Chairman of the Executive Committee of the Moscow City Soviet (the equivalent of mayor). He came into office soon after Kaganovich had been put in charge of the Moscow party organisation. 

In 1934, the 17th Congress of the Communist Party elected Bulganin as a candidate member of the Central Committee. A loyal Stalinist, he was promoted rapidly as other leaders fell victim to Joseph Stalin's Great Purge in 1937 and 1938. In July 1937, Bulganin was appointed Chairman of the Council of People's Commissars (the equivalent of Prime Minister) of the Russian Soviet Federative Socialist Republic (RSFSR) after the arrest of the previous incumbent, Daniil Sulimov. Bulganin became a full member of the Central Committee later that year. In September 1938, he became Deputy Prime Minister of the Soviet Union and head of the State Bank of the USSR (Gosbank).

World War II
During World War II, Bulganin played a leading role in the government and Red Army, although he was never a front-line commander. His first posting was as chief political commissar on the Western Front, which was commanded by Marshal Timoshenko. He held similar posts until July 1944, when he was appointed the Soviet representative on the Polish Committee of National Liberation. On 18 November 1944, he was given the rank of General, and three days later he replaced Marshal Voroshilov on the State Defence Committee. He was also appointed USSR Deputy Minister for Defence, the Minister being Joseph Stalin. 

In March 1946, Bulganin became a candidate member of the 18th Politburo of the Communist Party. Later in March 1947, he succeeded Stalin as Minister for the Armed Forces, and was again Deputy Prime Minister of the Soviet Union, under Stalin, from 1947 to 1950. In November 1947, he was promoted to the rank of Marshal of the Soviet Union. By February 1948, he became a full member of the 18th Politburo.

Personality 
Bulganin reached the highest rank in the Red Army, despite only having served as political officer. His role was to ensure that none of the genuine wartime commanders, particularly Marshal Zhukov, became powerful enough to threaten Stalin. Pavel Sudoplatov, who participated in conferences in the Kremlin with him, wrote contemptuously about how Bulganin failed to understand elementary military concepts. Sudoplatov added:

In March 1949, Bulganin was replaced as Minister for Defence by a career soldier, Aleksandr Vasilevsky, and then was responsible for the arms industry.

Conversely, a 1955 report from the US Central Intelligence Agency suggests that Bulganin's tenure at the State Bank demonstrated high intelligence and his ability to learn quickly:

Premiership

After Stalin's death in March 1953, Bulganin moved into sixth place in the Soviet leadership, when he was reappointed to the post of Defense Minister, but with Marshal Zhukov as his deputy. He was an ally of Nikita Khrushchev during his power struggle with Georgy Malenkov, and in February 1955 he succeeded Malenkov as Premier of the Soviet Union. He was generally seen as a supporter of Khrushchev's reforms and destalinisation. In July 1955, he attended the Geneva Summit, with U.S. President Dwight D. Eisenhower, French Prime Minister Edgar Faure, and British Prime Minister Anthony Eden.   He and Khrushchev travelled together to India, Yugoslavia and in April 1956 to Britain, where they were known in the press as "the B and K show" or "Bulge and Crush". In his memoirs, however, Khrushchev recounted that he believed that he "couldn't rely on [Bulganin] fully."

During the Suez Crisis of October–November 1956, Bulganin sent letters to the governments of the United Kingdom, France, and Israel threatening rocket attacks on London, Paris, and Tel Aviv if they did not withdraw their forces from Egypt. In a letter to Israeli prime minister David Ben-Gurion, Bulganin wrote, "Israel is playing with the fate of peace, with the fate of its own people, in a criminal and irresponsible manner; [...] which will place a question [mark] upon the very existence of Israel as a State." Khrushchev, in his memoirs, admitted the threat was designed simply to divide Western opinion, especially since at the time he did not have enough ICBMs to launch the rockets, and in any case he had no intention of going to war in 1956.

By 1957, however, Bulganin had come to share the doubts held about Khrushchev's policies by the opposition group (which Khrushchev and his supporters labelled the "Anti-Party Group") led by Vyacheslav Molotov. In June, when the dissenters tried to remove Khrushchev from power at a meeting of the Politburo, Bulganin vacillated between the two camps. When the dissenters were defeated and removed from power, Bulganin held on to his position for a while, but in March 1958, at a session of the Supreme Soviet, Khrushchev forced his resignation. 
Bulganin was appointed Chairman of the Soviet State Bank, a job he had held two decades before, but in August was dispatched to Stavropol as Chairman of the Regional Economic Council, a token position, and on 12 November he was expelled from the Presidium (Politburo) of the Central Committee. In September he was removed from the Central Committee and deprived of the title of Marshal, and in February 1960 he was retired on a pension.

Personal life and death
His wife was Elena Mikhailovna Korovina, an English teacher from a Moscow school. The couple had two children: son Leo and daughter Vera. Vera married the son of Admiral Nikolai Kuznetsov. 

Bulganin died on February 24, 1975, after a long illness at the age 79 and was buried in the Novodevichy Cemetery.

Honours and awards

See also
 Bibliography of the Russian Revolution and Civil War
 Bibliography of Stalinism and the Soviet Union
 Bibliography of the Post Stalinist Soviet Union
 Stalin: Waiting for Hitler, 1929-1941

References

External links

 

1895 births
1975 deaths
Politicians from Nizhny Novgorod
People from Nizhegorodsky Uyezd
Russian Social Democratic Labour Party members
Old Bolsheviks
Politburo of the Central Committee of the Communist Party of the Soviet Union members
Heads of government of the Soviet Union
Soviet Ministers of Defence
People's commissars and ministers of the Soviet Union
First convocation members of the Soviet of Nationalities
Second convocation members of the Soviet of Nationalities
Third convocation members of the Soviet of Nationalities
Fourth convocation members of the Soviet of Nationalities
Fifth convocation members of the Soviet of Nationalities
Heads of government of the Russian Soviet Federative Socialist Republic
People's commissars and ministers of the Russian Soviet Federative Socialist Republic
Members of the Supreme Soviet of the Russian Soviet Federative Socialist Republic, 1938–1947
Members of the Supreme Soviet of the Russian Soviet Federative Socialist Republic, 1947–1951
Members of the Supreme Soviet of the Russian Soviet Federative Socialist Republic, 1951–1955
Members of the Supreme Soviet of the Russian Soviet Federative Socialist Republic, 1955–1959
Second convocation members of the Verkhovna Rada of the Ukrainian Soviet Socialist Republic
Third convocation members of the Verkhovna Rada of the Ukrainian Soviet Socialist Republic
Fourth convocation members of the Verkhovna Rada of the Ukrainian Soviet Socialist Republic
Members of the Supreme Soviet of the Kazakh Soviet Socialist Republic
Chairmen of the Board of Gosbank
Chairpersons of the Executive Committee of Mossovet
Anti-revisionists
Marshals of the Soviet Union
Cheka
Heroes of Socialist Labour
Recipients of the Order of Lenin
Recipients of the Order of the Red Banner
Recipients of the Order of Suvorov, 1st class
Recipients of the Order of Kutuzov, 1st class
Grand Crosses of the Virtuti Militari
Recipients of the Virtuti Militari (1943–1989)
Burials at Novodevichy Cemetery